The 2011 Copa Sudamericana de Clubes (officially the 2011 Copa Bridgestone Sudamericana de Clubes for sponsorship reasons) was the 10th edition of the Copa Sudamericana, South America's secondary international club football tournament organized by CONMEBOL. The winner, Universidad de Chile, qualified for the 2012 Copa Libertadores, the 2012 Recopa Sudamericana, and the 2012 Suruga Bank Championship.

Qualified teams

Draw
The draw was originally to be held on June 14, 2011 at CONMEBOL's Convention Center in Luque, Paraguay, but was postponed by CONMEBOL due to disruptions to air traffic in the region by the volcanic eruption of the Puyehue-Cordón Caulle volcanic complex, first to June 16, and then to June 21, and finally to June 28, with the venue switched to the Sheraton Hotel in Buenos Aires, Argentina.

The tournament was played in single-elimination format, with each tie played over two legs. The draw mechanism was as follows:
First Stage
The sixteen teams which qualify through berths 2 and 3 from the eight countries other than Argentina and Brazil were drawn against each other. The matchups were based on countries: Bolivia v Paraguay, Chile v Uruguay, Colombia v Peru, Ecuador v Venezuela.
Second Stage
The eight winners of the First Stage were drawn against the eight teams which qualify through berth 1 from the eight countries other than Argentina and Brazil.
The six teams from Argentina, excluding the defending champion, were drawn against each other, where the matchups were based on the berths which the teams qualify through: 1 v 6, 2 v 5, 3 v 4, with the former playing the second leg at home.
The eight teams from Brazil were drawn against each other, where the matchups were based on the berths which the teams qualify through: 1 v 8, 2 v 7, 3 v 6, 4 v 5, with the former playing the second leg at home.
Final stages
The 15 winners of the Second Stage, together with the defending champion, were assigned a "seed" starting from the round of 16, which was used to determine the bracket of the final stages, with the higher-seeded team playing the second leg at home in each tie.

Change of sponsorship
During the draw, CONMEBOL announced that Bridgestone would replace Nissan Motors as the primary sponsor of the tournament. The official name of the tournament would be changed accordingly to the Copa Bridgestone Sudamericana.

Schedule
All dates listed are Wednesdays, but matches may be played on the day before (Tuesdays) and after (Thursdays) as well.

Preliminary stages

The first two stages of the competition are the First Stage and Second Stage. Both stages are largely played concurrent to each other.

First stage
The First Stage began on August 2 and ended on August 25. Team 1 played the second leg at home.

|-

|-

|-

|-

|-

|-

|-

|-

|}

Second stage
The Second Stage began on August 10 and ended on September 22. Team 1 played the second leg at home.

|-

|}

Final stages

Teams from the Round of 16 onwards were seeded depending on which second stage tie they won (i.e., the winner of Match O1 would be assigned the 1 seed, etc.; the defending champion, Independiente, was assigned the 5 seed).

Bracket
In each tie, the higher-seeded team played the second leg at home.

Round of 16
The Round of 16 began on September 28 and ended on October 26. Team 1 played the second leg at home.

|-

|}

Quarterfinals
The Quarterfinals began on November 1 and ended on November 17. Team 1 played the second leg at home.

|-

|}

Semifinals
The Semifinals began on November 23 and ended on November 30. Team 1 played the second leg at home.

|-

|}

Finals

The Finals were played over two legs, with the higher-seeded team playing the second leg at home. If the teams were tied on points and goal difference at the end of regulation in the second leg, the away goals rule would not be applied and 30 minutes of extra time would be played. If still tied after extra time, the title would be decided by penalty shootout.

Universidad de Chile won on points 6–0.

Top goalscorers

See also
2011 Copa Libertadores
2012 Recopa Sudamericana
2012 Suruga Bank Championship

References

External links
Official webpage 

 
2
2011